A Twist of Lemmon: A Tribute to My Father is a memoir-styled book concerning the life of famed American actor Jack Lemmon, as viewed through the eyes of his son, Christopher Lemmon. The book was published in May 2006 by Algonquin Books, and features a foreword by Kevin Spacey, who credits Jack Lemmon with his pursuit of acting. It was adapted into a play with Christopher Lemmon playing the role of his father.

External links
 Algonquin Books: A Twist of Lemmon

American biographies
2005 non-fiction books